Daniel Michael DeVito Jr. (born November 17, 1944) is an American actor, comedian, and filmmaker. He gained prominence for his portrayal of the taxi dispatcher Louie De Palma in the television series Taxi (1978–1983), which won him a Golden Globe Award and an Emmy Award. He plays Frank Reynolds on the FX and FXX sitcom It's Always Sunny in Philadelphia (2006–present).

He is known for his film roles in One Flew Over the Cuckoo's Nest (1975), Terms of Endearment (1983), Romancing the Stone (1984), Throw Momma from the Train (1987), Twins (1988), The War of the Roses (1989), Batman Returns (1992), Jack the Bear (1993), Junior (1994), Get Shorty (1995), Matilda (1996), L.A. Confidential (1997), The Big Kahuna (1999), Big Fish (2003), Deck the Halls (2006), When in Rome (2010), Wiener-Dog (2016) and Jumanji: The Next Level (2019). He is also known for his voice roles in such films as Hercules (1997), The Lorax (2012) and Smallfoot (2018).

DeVito and Michael Shamberg founded Jersey Films. Soon afterwards, Stacey Sher became an equal partner. The production company is known for films such as Pulp Fiction, Garden State, and Freedom Writers. DeVito also owned Jersey Television, which produced the Comedy Central series Reno 911!. DeVito and wife Rhea Perlman starred together in his 1996 film Matilda, based on Roald Dahl's children's novel. DeVito was also one of the producers nominated for an Academy Award for Best Picture for Erin Brockovich (2000).

In 2017, he earned a Tony Award nomination for Best Featured Actor in a Play for his performance in the Broadway revival of Arthur Miller's The Price.

Early life
DeVito was born at Raleigh Fitkin-Paul Morgan Memorial Hospital in Neptune Township, New Jersey, the son of Daniel DeVito Sr., a small business owner, and Julia DeVito ( Moccello). He grew up in a family of five, with his parents and two older sisters. He is of Italo-Albanian descent; his family is originally from San Fele, Basilicata, as well as from the Arbëresh Albanian community of Calabria. He was raised in Asbury Park, New Jersey; notably, he would live just miles away from the original Jersey Mike's location and would eat there frequently, which would partially inspire him to become the sub shop's first-ever celebrity spokesman in a line of commercials that began to air in September 2022.

DeVito was raised as a Catholic. When he was 14, he persuaded his father to send him to boarding school to "keep him out of trouble", and graduated from Oratory Preparatory School in Summit, New Jersey, in 1962. While working as a beautician at his sister's salon, his search for a professional makeup instructor led him to the American Academy of Dramatic Arts, where he graduated in 1966. In his early theater days, he performed with the Colonnades Theater Lab at the Eugene O'Neill Theater Center in Waterford, Connecticut. Along with his future wife Rhea Perlman, he appeared in plays produced by the Westbeth Playwrights Feminist Collective.

Career

Film work

DeVito played Martini in the 1975 film One Flew Over the Cuckoo's Nest, reprising his role from the 1971 off-Broadway play of the same title.

After his time on the Taxi series ended, DeVito devoted more effort to a growing successful film career, appearing as Vernon Dalhart in the 1983 hit Terms of Endearment; as the comic rogue Ralph in the romantic adventure Romancing the Stone (1984), starring Michael Douglas and Kathleen Turner; and its sequel, The Jewel of the Nile (1985). In 1986, DeVito starred in Ruthless People with Bette Midler and Judge Reinhold, and in 1987 he made his feature-directing debut with the dark comedy Throw Momma from the Train, in which he starred with Billy Crystal and Anne Ramsey. He reunited with Douglas and Turner two years later in The War of the Roses (1989), which he directed and in which he co-starred.

Other work included Other People's Money with Gregory Peck; director Barry Levinson's Tin Men, as a rival salesman to Richard Dreyfuss' character; the comedies Junior (1994) and Twins (1988) with Arnold Schwarzenegger; playing the villain The Penguin in director Tim Burton's Batman Returns (1992); and the film adaptation Matilda (1996), which he directed and co-produced, along with playing the role of Matilda's father, the villainous car dealer Harry Wormwood.

Although generally a comic actor, DeVito expanded into dramatic roles with The Rainmaker (1997); Hoffa (1992), which he directed and in which he co-starred with Jack Nicholson; Jack the Bear (1993); neo-noir film L.A. Confidential (1997); The Big Kahuna (1999); and Heist (2001), as a gangster nemesis of Joe Moore (Gene Hackman).

DeVito has an interest in documentaries. In 2006 he began a partnership with Morgan Freeman's company ClickStar, for whom he hosts the documentary channel Jersey Docs. He was also interviewed in the documentary Revenge of the Electric Car, discussing his interest in and ownership of electric vehicles.

Theatre
In April 2012, DeVito made his West End acting debut in a revival of the Neil Simon play The Sunshine Boys as Willie Clark, alongside Richard Griffiths. It previewed at the Savoy Theatre in London from April 27, 2012, opened on May 17, and played a limited 12-week season until July 28.

DeVito made his Broadway debut in a Roundabout Theatre Company revival of the Arthur Miller play The Price as Gregory Solomon, for which he was nominated for a Tony Award. The production began preview performances at the American Airlines Theatre on February 16, 2017, and opened on March 16 for a limited run-through on May 7.

Producing
DeVito has become a major film and television producer. DeVito founded Jersey Films in 1991, producing films like Pulp Fiction, Get Shorty, Erin Brockovich (for which he received an Academy Award nomination for Best Picture), Gattaca, and Garden State. In 1999, he produced and co-starred in Man on the Moon, a film about the unusual life of his former Taxi co-star Andy Kaufman, played in the film by Jim Carrey. DeVito also produced the Comedy Central series Reno 911!, the film spin-off Reno 911!: Miami, and the revival on Quibi.

Directing
DeVito made his directorial debut in 1984 with The Ratings Game. He then directed and starred in Throw Momma from the Train (1987), The War of the Roses (1989), Hoffa (1992), Matilda (1996), Death to Smoochy (2002) and Duplex (2003). The War of the Roses was a commercial and critical success, as was the film adaptation of Roald Dahl's Matilda; Death to Smoochy and Duplex had mixed reviews. He also directed the TV movie Queen B in 2005.

DeVito has directed eight short films between 1973 and 2016, five of which were released across 2010 and 2011. These are The Sound Sleeper (1973), Minestrone (1975), Oh Those Lips (2010), Evil Eye (2010), Poison Tongue (2011), Skin Deep (2011), Nest of Vipers (2011) and Curmudgeons (2016).

Television and voice-over work

In 1977, DeVito played the role of John "John John the Apple" DeAppoliso in the Starsky & Hutch episode "The Collector". DeVito gained fame in 1978 playing Louie De Palma, the short but domineering dispatcher for the fictional Sunshine Cab Company, on the hit TV show Taxi.

In 1986, he directed and starred in the black comedy "The Wedding Ring", a season 2 episode of Steven Spielberg's anthology series Amazing Stories, where his character acquires an engagement ring for his wife (played by DeVito's real-life wife, actress Rhea Perlman). When the ring is slipped on his wife's finger, she is possessed by the ring's former owner, a murderous black widow. That year, DeVito also voiced the Grundle King in My Little Pony: The Movie. In 1990, he and Rhea Perlman played the couple Vic & Paula, commenting on the state of the environment in The Earth Day Special. In 1991 and 1992, DeVito voiced Herb Powell in the episodes "Brother, Can You Spare Two Dimes?" and "Oh Brother, Where Art Thou?" of The Simpsons. In 1996, he provided the voice of Mr. Swackhammer in Space Jam. In 1997, he was the voice of Philoctetes in the film Hercules.

In 1999, DeVito hosted the last Saturday Night Live episode before the year 2000. He earned a 2004 Emmy nomination for Outstanding Guest Actor in a Comedy Series for an episode of Friends, following four Emmy nominations (including a 1981 win) for Outstanding Supporting Actor in a Comedy for Taxi. In 2006, he joined the cast of It's Always Sunny in Philadelphia as Frank Reynolds.

In 2011, DeVito received a star on the Hollywood Walk of Fame for his work in television. In 2012, he voiced the title character in the animated version of Dr. Seuss's The Lorax. In 2013, along with Rashida Jones, he voiced Herb for the third time on "The Changing of the Guardian" episode of The Simpsons (aired January 27, 2013). He appeared in the Angry Birds Friends "Champions for Earth" tournament advertisement in September 2015. Following the Japanese release of the Nintendo 3DS game Detective Pikachu, dedicated Pokémon fans submitted a 40,000-signature petition requesting that DeVito be the English voice actor for the title character. However, he declined to audition for the role, commenting that he was unfamiliar with the franchise.

Appearances in other media
DeVito played a fictional version of himself in the music video of One Direction's song "Steal My Girl". He also appeared in the short film Curmudgeons, which he also produced and directed.

In 2021, DeVito wrote a 12-page story centered on the Penguin and Catwoman for the anthology comic Gotham City Villains.

Personal life
His short stature is the result of multiple epiphyseal dysplasia (Fairbank's disease), a rare genetic disorder that affects bone growth.

On January 17, 1971, DeVito met Rhea Perlman when she went to see a friend in the single performance of the play The Shrinking Bride, which featured DeVito. They moved in together two weeks later and married on January 28, 1982. They have three children: Lucy Chet DeVito (born March 11, 1983), Grace Fan DeVito (born March 1985), and Jacob Daniel DeVito (born October 1987).

Perlman and DeVito have acted alongside each other several times, including in the television show Taxi and the feature film Matilda (where they played Matilda's parents). They separated in October 2012, after 30 years of marriage and over 40 years together, then reconciled in March 2013. They separated for a second time in March 2017, but remained on amicable terms and Perlman stated they had no intent of filing for divorce. In 2019, Perlman told interviewer Andy Cohen that she and DeVito have become closer friends after their separation than they were in their final years as a couple.

DeVito and Perlman resided in a 14,579-square-foot (1,354 m2) house in Beverly Hills, California, that they purchased in 1994, until selling it for US$24 million in April 2015. They also own a bungalow near Rodeo Drive in Beverly Hills, and a multi-residence compound on Broad Beach in Malibu. They also frequented a home they owned in Interlaken, New Jersey to get away from Los Angeles.

DeVito and Perlman are members of the steering committee of the Friends of the Apollo, supporting a theater in Oberlin, Ohio, as was filmmaker Jonathan Demme. DeVito co-owned a restaurant called DeVito South Beach in Miami Beach, Florida, which closed in 2011. Politically, DeVito is a Democrat and a staunch supporter of Bernie Sanders.

Filmography

DeVito has an extensive film career, dating back to the early 1970s.

Selected work:

Awards and nominations
DeVito has a large and varied body of work as an actor, producer and director in stage, television and film. He has been nominated for Academy awards, Creative Arts Emmy awards, Golden Globe awards, Primetime Emmy awards, Producers Guild awards, Screen Actors Guild awards and Tony awards. In 2011 he was honored with a star on the Hollywood Walk of Fame, at 6909 Hollywood Blvd., for his contributions to television.

References

External links 

 
 
 
 
 
 
 
 Danny DeVito's Guest DJ Set on KCRW
 Danny DeVito interviewed by KVUE's Roy Faires in 1971 about "Throw Momma From The Train" from Texas Archive of the Moving Image

1944 births
Living people
20th-century American comedians
20th-century American male actors
21st-century American comedians
21st-century American male actors
American Academy of Dramatic Arts alumni
American people of Italian descent
American male comedians
American male comedy actors
American male film actors
American male television actors
American male voice actors
American people of Arbëreshë descent
American people of Albanian descent
American social democrats
Best Supporting Actor Golden Globe (television) winners
Catholics from New Jersey
Comedians from New Jersey
Comedy film directors
Film directors from New Jersey
Film producers from New Jersey
Male actors from New Jersey
New Jersey Hall of Fame inductees
Outstanding Performance by a Supporting Actor in a Comedy Series Primetime Emmy Award winners
People from Asbury Park, New Jersey
People from Interlaken, New Jersey

People from Neptune Township, New Jersey
Television producers from New Jersey